Derri Daugherty (born Derald Daugherty; October 13, 1958) is an American record producer, songwriter, guitarist and singer, best known as the lead singer and guitarist for band the Choir.

Daugherty is also one of the founding members of the Roots music supergroup Lost Dogs with Terry Scott Taylor, Michael Roe and Gene Eugene.

Daugherty began his musical career as an engineer and roadie for the band Daniel Amos. Their bassist, Tim Chandler, introduced Daugherty to Steve Hindalong and the two soon began to write songs together and eventually formed the Choir. Daugherty now owns and operates Neverland, a recording studio in Nashville, Tennessee.

Daugherty's engineering credits include albums for Randy Stonehill, The Swoon, Lifesavers Underground, Michael Knott, the Prayer Chain, Riki Michele, the Waiting, Sarah Masen, Pierce Pettis, Common Children, Jeff Johnson, Caedmon's Call, Buddy Miller, Julie Miller, the Throes, and others. In recent years, Daugherty has become an accomplished producer, with albums by Twila Paris and Sheila Walsh to his credit. Perhaps his most well known production work is with Hindalong on the City on a Hill series.

Discography
 A Few Unfinished Songs, 2004, ep Lo-Fidelity Records www.lo-fidelity.com
 Clouds Echo in Blue, 2011, ambient instrumental guitar
 Hush Sorrow, 2016
 Unhypnotized, 2018, single from album, The Color Of Dreams
 The Color of Dreams, 2018

References

External links 
AllMusic
http://www.last.fm/music/Derri+Daugherty

1958 births
Living people
American performers of Christian music
American male singers
American rock guitarists
American male guitarists
American audio engineers
Record producers from Tennessee
Singers from Nashville, Tennessee
Road crew
20th-century American guitarists
Lost Dogs members
The Choir (alternative rock band) members
20th-century American male musicians